The Mighty Manatees is an American band based in Montgomery County, Pennsylvania. Throughout a career spanning four decades, the band has performed in a wide range of styles including blues, reggae, country, folk, ska, funk, zydeco and rock 'n roll—distilled into a genre described as "Dreadneck", a term not easily defined. They have formerly been known by a variety of other stage names, including The Manatees, and The Mighty Manatees Medicine Show. 

On September 11, 2002 the band played in a tribute to those who died in the September 11 attacks.

In 2012 Jim Cavanaugh and Will Hodgson played in Belfast and Dublin, backing up Shana Morrison opening for father Van Morrison.

In 2015 the group performed at a theater in Sellersville, Pennsylvania to celebrate their 30th anniversary and to memorialize a Pennsylvania-born teenager who died of a brain tumor.

Discography
1988 [Cassette] Manatees - Live
1989 [Cassette] History Of The Manatees Vol. One
1991 High Water
1991 The Shoreline Sampler Vol. One (Compilation)
1992 The Mighty Manatees - Whiskey Joe's
1996 South Paw
1996 Live Medicine
1996 'Tees In The Keys
2002 All Heaven Broke
2002 Manatee Masquerade
2003 Go Forward (Compilation)
2003 Good Friday Tracks - La Banda Grande
2004 Tall Pines (acoustic)
2006 No "L" (Christmas compilation)
2008 The Mighty Manatees
2009 The Mighty Manatees Live!
2013 Medicine Show

Video Releases
1989 Manatees In Manhattan (60min)
1990 Save This (30 min)

References

External links
The Mighty Manatees's official site

Musical groups from Pennsylvania